Sumera Mikoto no Fumi may refer to:
Tennōki (天皇記), an historical Japanese text from 620.
Teiki (帝紀), an historical Japanese text from 681.